The Canadian federal election of 2006 in the province of Ontario gave 54 of the 106 seats to the Liberals - a loss of 21 seats compared to the previous election of 2004. The Conservatives won 40 seats (up by 17), and the remaining 12 went to the N.D.P. (up by 4).

Ottawa

Eastern Ontario

Central Ontario

Southern Durham and York

Suburban Toronto

Central Toronto

Brampton, Mississauga and Oakville

Hamilton, Burlington and Niagara

Midwestern Ontario

Southwestern Ontario

Northern Ontario

2006 Canadian federal election